Clostebol (also known as 4-chlorotestosterone) usually as the ester clostebol acetate, is a synthetic anabolic–androgenic steroid (AAS). Clostebol is the 4-chloro derivative of the natural hormone testosterone. The chlorination prevents conversion to dihydrotestosterone (DHT) while also rendering the chemical incapable of conversion to estrogen. Although usually used as an ester including clostebol acetate (Macrobin, Steranabol, Alfa-Trofodermin, Megagrisevit), clostebol caproate (Macrobin-Depot), or clostebol propionate (Yonchlon), unmodified/non-esterified clostebol is also reported to be marketed, under the brand name Trofodermin-S in Mexico.

Clostebol is a weak AAS with potential use as a performance enhancing drug. It is currently banned by the World Anti-Doping Agency. Chlorodehydromethyltestosterone (Oral Turinabol), combining the chemical structures of clostebol and metandienone, was widely used in the East German state-sponsored doping program.

Medical uses
Clostebol acetate ointment has ophthalmological and dermatological use.

Side effects

Chemistry

Clostebol, also known as 4-chlorotestosterone or as 4-chloroandrost-4-en-17β-ol-3-one, is a synthetic androstane steroid and a derivative of testosterone. It is specifically the 4-chlorinated derivative of testosterone.

Society and culture

Nutritional supplements
A related anabolic steroid, methylclostebol, is a common additive in so-called dietary supplements, generally listed in the convoluted form 4-chloro-17α-methyl-androst-4-en-17β-ol-3-one.

Publicized abuse cases

Use of clostebol has led to the suspension of a number of athletes in various sports including Freddy Galvis of the Philadelphia Phillies in 2012, Dee Gordon of the Miami Marlins in 2016, Olympic athlete Viktoria Orsi Toth in 2016, Serie A soccer player José Luis Palomino of Club Atalanta, and Fernando Tatís Jr. of the San Diego Padres in 2022. Tatís Jr, who had missed the entirety of the season due to a broken wrist, accepted the suspension while claiming that it was an inadvertent breach after taking a ringworm medication that he had failed to check the ingredients list for banned substances. and Orlando Galo from Club Sport Herediano in 2022

In 2016, urinalysis resulted in Therese Johaug testing positive for clostebol.

Regulation
In the U.S., clostebol is listed as a Schedule III controlled substance, meaning the U.S. federal government considers it to have a potential for abuse as well as a currently accepted medical use.

See also 
 Chlorodehydromethyltestosterone
 Methylclostebol

References 

Androgens and anabolic steroids
Androstanes
Enones
Organochlorides
World Anti-Doping Agency prohibited substances